Off the map may refer to:

Off the Map (video), 2001 video of concerts by American band Red Hot Chili Peppers
Off the Map (film), an American drama film released in 2003
Off the Map (TV series), an American drama series produced during 2011
Off the Map, American collection of short stories by Daniel Wallace (author)
 "Off the Map" (SoFaygo song)

See also
A Bit Off the Map, and Other Stories, a collection of prose by English author Angus Wilson